People of the Mountains (Hungarian: Emberek a havason) is a 1942 Hungarian drama film directed by István Szőts and starring Alice Szellay, János Görbe, Péterke Ferency. The film is set in the Székely woodcutting community of Transylvania. The film's plot was based on a series of short stories by József Nyírő. The film was exhibited at the 1942 Venice Film Festival, where it was widely praised. The film's style has been suggested as an influence on the emerging Italian neorealism. It was not granted an exhibition certificate in Nazi Germany because Joseph Goebbels considered it "too Catholic". The film was chosen to be part of the New Budapest Twelve, a list of Hungarian films considered the best in 2000.

Production
The film was shot on location in Northern Transylvania, which had been ceded back to the Kingdom of Hungary by the Kingdom of Romania according to the Second Vienna Award in 1940, before Hungary and Romania entered the Second World War. Interior scenes were filmed at the Hunnia Film Studio in Budapest. The film was originally conceived as a short film, but studios bosses agreed to make it a feature film as long as costs could be kept low. Szőts had a relatively small film crew, and cast largely unknown actors in the leading roles.

Cast
 Alice Szellay as Anna az asszony 
 János Görbe as Erdei Csutak Gergely 
 Péterke Ferency as Gergő, their son 
 József Bihari as Üdő Márton 
 Lajos Gárday as Ülkei Ádám 
 ?  as István, the manager
 ?  as The Judge 
 Oszkár Borovszky as Intéző / Steward
 Lenke Egyed as Szobaasszony / Landlady
 Imre Toronyi as Orvos / Village Doctor
 György Kürthy as Orvostanár / Medical Professor Gyorgy Benda
 János Pásztor as Favágó / Woodcutter
 Elemér Baló as Favágó / Woodcutter
 Jenő Danis as Favágó / Woodcutter
 Sándor Hidassy as Utas / Passenger
 János Makláry as Kalauz / Conductor

References

Bibliography
 Cunningham, John. Hungarian Cinema: From Coffee House to Multiplex. Wallflower Press, 2004.

External links
 

1942 films
1942 drama films
Hungarian drama films
1940s Hungarian-language films
Films directed by István Szőts
Films set in Transylvania
Hungarian black-and-white films